Joseph Robbins Kinney (April 15, 1839 – November 7, 1919) was a merchant, notary public and political figure in Nova Scotia, Canada. He represented the Yarmouth district in the House of Commons of Canada from 1882 to 1887 as a Liberal member.

The son of William Kinney (1809–1890) and Orpah Robbins, he was born in Annapolis Royal, Nova Scotia. In 1860, he married Ada E. Ritchie. Kinney was consular agent for the United States. He represented Yarmouth County in the Nova Scotia House of Assembly from 1878 to 1882. He ran unsuccessfully for reelection to the House of Commons in 1887 and 1891. Kinney was married twice: to Ada E. Ritchie in 1860 and in 1881 to Mary B. Dakin.  Kinney served as Inspector of Fisheries for Nova Scotia for the division West of Halifax from 1890 to 1895.
His brother, also named William Kinney (1832–1915), traveled to the Hawaiian Islands where he owned a sugar plantation.
Nephew William Ansel Kinney became a lawyer, and nephew Ray Kinney (1900–1972) a popular musician.

Electoral record

References 

1839 births
1919 deaths
Nova Scotia Liberal Party MLAs
Liberal Party of Canada MPs
Members of the House of Commons of Canada from Nova Scotia
People from Yarmouth County